Erik Wekesser (born 3 July 1997) is a German professional footballer who plays as a left-back or forward for  club 1. FC Nürnberg.

Career
Wekesser joined Jahn Regensburg in 2019.

On 2 February 2022, Wekesser agreed to join 1. FC Nürnberg for the 2022–23 season.

References

External links
 
 

1997 births
Living people
People from Schwetzingen
Sportspeople from Karlsruhe (region)
Footballers from Baden-Württemberg
German footballers
Association football fullbacks
Association football forwards
Germany youth international footballers
1. FC Kaiserslautern players
1. FC Kaiserslautern II players
TuS Koblenz players
FC Astoria Walldorf players
SSV Jahn Regensburg players
1. FC Nürnberg players
2. Bundesliga players
Regionalliga players
Oberliga (football) players